Kingston On Murray (formerly Thurk and Kingston O.M.) is a town on the south bank of the Murray River in the Riverland region of South Australia. Its name is ultimately derived from Charles Kingston who was Premier of South Australia from 1893 to 1899. At the 2006 census, the town had a population of 257.

History
The town was surveyed in January 1915 and originally proclaimed as Thurk on 21 November 1918. Its size was reduced on 19 July 1934 and again on 13 July 1939.  The name was derived from Thurk Homestead where the word Thurk is itself derived from an aboriginal word tharko that means the mouth.

The town's name was changed from Thurk to Kingston O.M. on 19 September 1940. The name was derived from the Kingston Village Settlement Area, a settlement which was established in 1896 and whose name is derived from Charles Kingston, the then Premier of South Australia.

The name was altered at the request of residents from Kingston O.M. to Kingston On Murray on 31 March 1994. Erratum published in Government Gazette 24 November 1994 to correct the incorrect use of hyphens in the original Notice to Assign.

Boundaries for the locality of Kingston on Murray were created on 28 September 2000 and include the sites of the Kingston Ferry Shack Site and the government town of Kingston On Murray.

Overview
The Sturt Highway now bypasses the town and crosses the Murray River over a bridge. Before the bridge was opened in 1973, there were two vehicular cable ferries in the town to carry traffic over the river.

Kingston On Murray is in the District Council of Loxton Waikerie, the state electoral district of Chaffey and the federal Division of Barker.

Kingston Estate and Accolade Wines' Banrock Station brand have wineries near Kingston On Murray. There is also the Ramsar-listed Banrock Station Wetlands.

The historic Kingston On Murray Pump Site and Feeder Tank Ruins are listed on the South Australian Heritage Register.

See also
 List of crossings of the Murray River

References

External links

Towns in South Australia
Populated places on the Murray River
Riverland